The 2015 Los Angeles Angels of Anaheim season was the franchise's 55th season and 50th in Anaheim (all of them at Angel Stadium). As of 2022, this remains the Angels last winning season.

Offseason

October 30: Joe Thatcher, John McDonald, and Jason Grilli become free agents.
 Grilli signed with the Atlanta Braves.

November 5: Received Carlos Pérez and Nick Tropeano from the Houston Astros for Hank Conger. Also traded Mark Sappington to the Tampa Bay Rays for Cesar Ramos.

November 11: Signed Raywilly Gomez to a minor league contract.

November 12: Signed Jeremy McBryde.

November 20: Sent 3 players to the minors while promoting 2 others. Received Daniel Robertson from the Texas Rangers for cash.

November 23: Signed Brian Broderick.

November 24: Signed 3 players to a minor league contract and invited them to spring training.

November 27: Signed D'Arby Myers to a minor league contract and invited him to spring training.

December 2: Yoslan Herrera, Wade LeBlanc, and Gordon Beckham become free agents.
 Beckham returned to the Chicago White Sox.

December 4 and December 5: Signed 3 players to a minor league contract and invited them to spring training.

December 8: Claimed Marc Krauss off waiver from the Houston Astros.
 He would be sent to the minors.

December 9: Received Drew Butera from the Los Angeles Dodgers for Matt Long.

December 11: Three trades were made this day:
 Received Taylor Featherston from the Chicago Cubs for cash.
 Received Andrew Heaney from the Dodgers for Howie Kendrick.
 Received Josh Rutledge from the Colorado Rockies for Jairo Diaz.

December 16: Received Matt Joyce from the Tampa Bay Rays for Kevin Jepsen.

December 19: Received Johnny Giavotella from the Kansas City Royals for Brian Broderick, while releasing Shawn O'Malley and signing Roberto Baldoquin to a minor league contract.

December 23: Signed 2 players to a minor league contract with an invite to Spring training while inviting 8 others to Spring training.

January 4: Signed Steven Hensley to a minor league contract.

January 8: Received Kyle Kubitza and Nate Hyatt from the Kansas City Royals for Ricardo Sanchez.

January 20: Signed Ryan Mattheus to a minor league contract.

January 30: Signed 2 players to a minor league contract.

February 3: Signed Jeff Malm to a minor league contract.

February 4: Sent Yency Almonte to the Chicago White Sox.

Standings

Season standings

American League West

American League Leaders

Record against opponents

Season summary
From the start of the season the Angels battled the Astros for the division title. They were in second place for the majority of the season between Astros (1st) and Rangers (3rd).

In early July, the baseball world focused their attention on the Angels following a report from Ken Rosenthal that general manager Jerry DiPoto and manager Mike Scioscia were at odds over the use of analytics in the clubhouse. Two days later, DiPoto cleaned out his Angels office and resigned.

Former Angels general manager Bill Stoneman, who hired Scioscia before the 2000 season, was named interim GM.

In July, the Angels briefly held first place in the AL West before losing 19 games in August.

The deciding game
On October 4, 2015, the final game of the season for the Angels and Rangers, the Angels lost against the Rangers, preventing them from entering the playoffs. If they had won, they would have entered a tiebreaker game with the Astros. If that was won, they would have entered the wild card game against the Yankees.

Game log

|- bgcolor="ffbbbb"
| 1 || April 6 || @ Mariners || 1–4 || Hernández (1–0) || Weaver (0–1) || Rodney (1) || 45,909 || 0–1
|- bgcolor="bbffbb"
| 2 || April 7 || @ Mariners || 2–0 || Wilson (1–0) || Paxton (0–1) || Street (1) || 26,545 || 1–1
|- bgcolor="bbffbb"
| 3 || April 8 || @ Mariners || 5–3 || Shoemaker (1–0) || Iwakuma (0–1) || Street (2) || 25,495 || 2–1
|- bgcolor="ffbbbb"
| 4 || April 10 || Royals || 2–4 || Vargas (1–0) || Santiago (0–1) || Davis (1) || 44,489 || 2–2
|- bgcolor="ffbbbb"
| 5 || April 11 || Royals || 4–6 || Guthrie (1–0) || Weaver (0–2) || Holland (3) || 44,154 || 2–3
|- bgcolor="ffbbbb"
| 6 || April 12 || Royals || 2–9 || Ventura (2–0) || Wilson (1–1) || — || 37,060 || 2–4
|- bgcolor="bbffbb"
| 7 || April 13 || @ Rangers || 6–3 || Shoemaker (2–0) || Detwiler (0–2) || Street (3) || 18,401 || 3–4
|- bgcolor="ffbbbb"
| 8 || April 14 || @ Rangers || 2–8 || Martinez (2–0) || Rucinski (0–1) || — || 21,805 || 3–5
|- bgcolor="bbffbb"
| 9 || April 15 || @ Rangers || 10–2 || Santiago (1–1) || Ranaudo (0–1) || — || 25,757 || 4–5
|- bgcolor="bbffbb"
| 10 || April 17 || @ Astros || 6–3 || Ramos (1–0) || Qualls (0–1) || Street (4) || 22,660 || 5–5
|- bgcolor="ffbbbb"
| 11 || April 18 || @ Astros || 0–4 || Keuchel (2–0) || Wilson (1–2) || — || 28,209 || 5–6
|- bgcolor="ffbbbb"
| 12 || April 19 || @ Astros || 3–4 || Feldman (1–2) || Richards (0–1) || Gregerson (2) || 24,254 || 5–7
|- bgcolor="ffbbbb"
| 13 || April 20 || Athletics || 3–6 || Otero (1–1) || Shoemaker (2–1) || Clippard (1) || 35,228 || 5–8
|- bgcolor="bbffbb"
| 14 || April 21 || Athletics || 14–1 || Santiago (2–1) || Pomeranz (1–2) || — || 32,137 || 6–8
|- bgcolor="ffbbbb"
| 15 || April 22 || Athletics || 2–9 || Gray (2–0) || Salas (0–1) || — || 30,034 || 6–9
|- bgcolor="bbffbb"
| 16 || April 23 || Athletics || 2–0 || Tropeano (1–0) || Chavez (0–1) || Street (5) || 24,304 || 7–9
|- bgcolor="bbffbb"
| 17 || April 24 || Rangers || 3–2 || Richards (1–1) || Kela (0–1) || Street (6) || 41,054 || 8–9
|- bgcolor="bbffbb"
| 18 || April 25 || Rangers || 4–1 || Pestano (1–0) || Lewis (1–2) || Street (7) || 38,016 || 9–9
|- bgcolor="ffbbbb"
| 19 || April 26 || Rangers || 1–2 (11) || Feliz (1–1) || Álvarez (0–1) || — || 35,053 || 9–10
|- bgcolor="ffbbbb"
| 20 || April 28 || @ Athletics || 2–6 || Gray (3–0) || Weaver (0–3) || — || 17,674 || 9–11
|- bgcolor="bbffbb"
| 21 || April 29 || @ Athletics || 6–3 || Morin (1–0) || Cook (0–1) || Street (8) || 16,212 || 10–11
|- bgcolor="bbffbb"
| 22 || April 30 || @ Athletics || 6–5 || Richards (2–1) || Chavez (0–2) || Street (9) || 19,534 || 11–11
|-

|- bgcolor="ffbbbb"
| 23 || May 1 || @ Giants || 2–3 || Casilla (3–0) || Smith (0–1) || — || 41,507 || 11–12
|- bgcolor="ffbbbb"
| 24 || May 2 || @ Giants || 4–5 || Hudson (1–2) || Santiago (2–2) || Casilla (7) || 41,287 || 11–13
|- bgcolor="ffbbbb"
| 25 || May 3 || @ Giants || 0–5 || Lincecum (2–2) || Weaver (0–4) || — || 41,516 || 11–14 
|- bgcolor="ffbbbb"
| 26 || May 4 || Mariners || 2–3 || Hernández (5–0) || Shoemaker (2–2) || Rodney (8) || 25,024 || 11–15
|- bgcolor="bbffbb"
| 27 || May 5 || Mariners || 5–4 || Street (1–0) || Leone (0–3) || — || 33,394 || 12–15
|- bgcolor="bbffbb"
| 28 || May 6 || Mariners || 4–3 || Street (2–0) || Smith (0–2) || — || 25,160 || 13–15
|- bgcolor="ffbbbb"
| 29 || May 7 || Astros || 2–3 || Neshek (3–0) || Street (2–1) || Gregerson (7) || 25,097 || 13–16
|- bgcolor="bbffbb"
| 30 || May 8 || Astros || 2–0 || Weaver (1–4) || Hernández (1–3) || — || 40,006 || 14–16
|- bgcolor="ffbbbb"
| 31 || May 9 || Astros || 5–6 || Keuchel (4–0) || Shoemaker (2–3) || Qualls (3) || 40,210 || 14–17
|- bgcolor="bbffbb"
| 32 || May 10 || Astros || 3–1 || Richards (3–1) || Feldman (2–4) || Street (10) || 30,929 || 15–17
|- bgcolor="bbffbb"
| 33 || May 12 || Rockies || 5–2 || Wilson (2–2) || Betancourt (0–1) || Street (11) || 28,150 || 16–17
|- bgcolor="bbffbb"
| 34 || May 13 || Rockies || 2–1 (11) || Ramos (2–0) || Friedrich (0–1) || — || 30,129 || 17–17
|- bgcolor="bbffbb"
| 35 || May 15 || @ Orioles || 3–1 || Weaver (2–4) || Chen (1–2) || Street (12) || 35,470 || 18–17
|- bgcolor="bbffbb"
| 36 || May 16 || @ Orioles || 6–1 || Shoemaker (3–3) || Jiménez (3–3) || — || 29,102 || 19–17
|- bgcolor="ffbbbb"
| 37 || May 17 || @ Orioles || 0–3 || Wright (1–0) || Richards (4–2) || Britton (8) || 41,733 || 19–18
|- bgcolor="ffbbbb"
| 38 || May 18 || @ Blue Jays || 6–10 || Osuna (1–0) || Morin (1–1) || — || 29,306 || 19–19
|- bgcolor="bbffbb"
| 39 || May 19 || @ Blue Jays || 3–2 || Santiago (3–2) || Sanchez (3–4) || Street (13) || 15,062 || 20–19
|- bgcolor="bbffbb"
| 40 || May 20 || @ Blue Jays || 4–3 || Weaver (3–4) || Hutchison (3–1) || Street (14) || 16,402 || 21–19
|- bgcolor="ffbbbb"
| 41 || May 21 || @ Blue Jays || 4–8 || Dickey (2–5) || Shoemaker (3–4) || — || 19,014 || 21–20
|- bgcolor="bbffbb"
| 42 || May 22 || @ Red Sox || 12–5 || Richards (4–2) || Porcello (4–3) || — || 36,150 || 22–20
|- bgcolor="ffbbbb"
| 43 || May 23 || @ Red Sox || 3–8 || Wright (2–1) || Wilson (2–3) || — || 37,735 || 22–21
|- bgcolor="ffbbbb"
| 44 || May 24 || @ Red Sox || 1–6 || Miley (4–4) || Santiago (3–3) || — || 37,742 || 22–22
|- bgcolor="bbffbb"
| 45 || May 25 || Padres || 4–3 || Smith (1–1)  || Quackenbush (1–1) || — || 38,055 || 23–22
|- bgcolor="ffbbbb"
| 46 || May 26 || Padres || 0–4 || Thayer (1–0) || Smith (1–2) || — || 32,334 || 23–23
|- bgcolor="ffbbbb"
| 47 || May 27 || Padres || 4–5 || Cashner (2–7) || Richards (4–3) || Kimbrel (12) || 36,180 || 23–24
|- bgcolor="bbffbb"
| 48 || May 28 || Tigers || 12–2 || Wilson (3–3) || Farmer (0–1) || — || 32,261 || 24–24
|- bgcolor="bbffbb"
| 49 || May 29 || Tigers || 2–0 || Santiago (4–3) || Sánchez (3–6) || Street (15) || 41,901 || 25–24
|- bgcolor="bbffbb"
| 50 || May 30 || Tigers || 8–6 || Weaver (4–4) || Greene (4–4) || Street (16) || 40,369 || 26–24
|- bgcolor="bbffbb"
| 51 || May 31 || Tigers || 4–2 || Smith (2–2) || Price (4–2) || Street (17) || 37,143 || 27–24
|-

|- bgcolor="bbffbb"
| 52 || June 1 || Rays || 7–3 || Richards (5–3) || Colomé (3–2) || — || 27,078 || 28–24
|- bgcolor="ffbbbb"
| 53 || June 2 || Rays || 1–6 || Archer (6–4) || Wilson (3–4) || — || 28,771 || 28–25
|- bgcolor="ffbbbb"
| 54 || June 3 || Rays || 5–6 (10) || Boxberger (3–3) || Street (2–2) || Geltz (2) || 28,245 || 28–26
|- bgcolor="ffbbbb"
| 55 || June 5 || @ Yankees || 7–8 || Eovaldi (5–1) || Weaver (4–5) || Betances (2) || 40,310 || 28–27
|- bgcolor="ffbbbb"
| 56 || June 6 || @ Yankees || 2–8 || Warren (4–4) || Richards (5–4) || — || 40,096 || 28–28
|- bgcolor="ffbbbb"
| 57 || June 7 || @ Yankees || 2–6 || Sabathia (3–7) || Wilson (3–5) || — || 43,178 || 28–29
|- bgcolor="bbffbb"
| 58 || June 9 || @ Rays || 8–2 || Shoemaker (4–4) || Karns (3–3) || — || 11,617 || 29–29
|- bgcolor="ffbbbb"
| 59 || June 10 || @ Rays || 2–4 || Ramírez (5–2) || Weaver (4–6) || McGee (1) || 10,088 || 29–30
|- bgcolor="bbffbb"
| 60 || June 11 || @ Rays || 6–2 || Richards (6–4) || Jepsen (1–4) || — || 10,779 || 30–30
|- bgcolor="bbffbb"
| 61 || June 12 || Athletics || 5–4 || Álvarez (1–1) || Scribner (1–1) || Street (18) || 42,113 || 31–30
|- bgcolor="bbffbb"
| 62 || June 13 || Athletics || 1–0 || Wilson (4–5) || Graveman (3–3) || Street (19) || 43,548 || 32–30
|- bgcolor="ffbbbb"
| 63 || June 14 || Athletics || 1–8 || Gray (8–3) || Shoemaker (4–5) || — || 35,143 || 32–31
|- bgcolor="ffbbbb"
| 64 || June 15 || D-backs || 3–7 || Ray (2–1) || Weaver (4–7) || Reed (3) || 35,193 || 32–32
|- bgcolor="bbffbb"
| 65 || June 16 || D-backs || 4–1 || Richards (7–4) || Hellickson (4–4) || Street (20) || 40,099 || 33–32
|- bgcolor="ffbbbb"
| 66 || June 17 || @ D-backs || 2–3 || Anderson (3–1) || Santiago (4–4) || Ziegler (9) || 28,481 || 33–33
|- bgcolor="bbffbb"
| 67 || June 18 || @ D-backs || 7–1 || Wilson (5–5) || Webster (1–1) || — || 28,942 || 34–33
|- bgcolor="bbffbb"
| 68 || June 19 || @ Athletics || 12–7 || Salas (1–1) || Mujica (2–2) || — || 25,528 || 35–33
|- bgcolor="ffbbbb"
| 69 || June 20 || @ Athletics || 1–4 || Hahn (5–5) || Weaver (4–8) || Clippard (11) || 26,471 || 35–34
|- bgcolor="ffbbbb"
| 70 || June 21 || @ Athletics || 2–3 || Kazmir (4–4)  || Richards (7–5)  || Clippard (12) || 29,137  || 35–35
|- bgcolor="bbffbb"
| 71 || June 22 || Astros || 4–3 || Street (3–2) || Qualls (1–4) || — || 34,153 || 36–35
|- bgcolor="ffbbbb"
| 72 || June 23 || Astros || 3–13 || McHugh (8–3) || Wilson (5–6) || — || 41,208 || 36–36
|- bgcolor="bbffbb"
| 73 || June 24 || Astros || 2–1 || Álvarez (2–1) || Thatcher (1–2) || — || 33,543 || 37–36
|- bgcolor="ffbbbb"
| 74 || June 26 || Mariners || 1–3 || Walker (6–6) || Shoemaker (4–6) || – || 41,137 || 37–37
|- bgcolor="bbffbb"
| 75 || June 27 || Mariners || 4–2 || Richards (8–5) || Happ (3–5)|| Street (21) || 40,514 || 38–37
|- bgcolor="bbffbb"
| 76 || June 28 || Mariners || 3–2 || Gott (1–0) || Wilhelmsen (1–2) || — || 38,387 || 39–37
|- bgcolor="bbffbb"
| 77 || June 29 || Yankees || 4–1 || Wilson (6–6) || Sabathia (3–8) || Street (22) || 42,056 || 40–37
|- bgcolor="bbffbb"
| 78 || June 30 || Yankees || 2–1 || Heaney (1–0) || Nova (1–1) || Street (23) || 42,036 || 41–37
|-

|- bgcolor="ffbbbb"
| 79 || July 1 || Yankees || 1–3 || Eovaldi (8–2) || Shoemaker (4–7) || — || 40,938 || 41–38
|- bgcolor="bbffbb"
| 80 || July 3 || @ Rangers || 8–2 || Richards (9–5) || Gonzalez (2–4) || — || 39,320 || 42–38
|- bgcolor="bbffbb"
| 81 || July 4 || @ Rangers || 13–0 || Santiago (5–4) || Rodríguez (5–4) || — || 47,877 || 43–38
|- bgcolor="bbffbb"
| 82 || July 5 || @ Rangers || 12–6 || Wilson (7–6) || Lewis (8–4) || — || 26,638 || 44–38
|- bgcolor="bbffbb"
| 83 || July 7 || @ Rockies || 10–2 || Heaney (2–0) || Bettis (4–4) || — || 26,232 || 45–38
|- bgcolor="bbffbb"
| 84 || July 8 || @ Rockies || 3–2 || Smith (3–2) || Axford (1–2) || Huston Street|Street (24) || 24,660 || 46–38
|- bgcolor="ffbbbb"
| 85 || July 9 || @ Mariners || 2–7 || Hernández (11–5) || Richards (9–6) || — || 28,131 || 46–39
|- bgcolor="bbffbb"
| 86 || July 10 || @ Mariners || 7–3 || Santiago (6–4) || Montgomery (4–3) || — || 29,679 || 47–39
|- bgcolor="ffbbbb"
| 87 || July 11 || @ Mariners || 0–5 || Iwakuma (1–1) || Wilson (7–7) || — || 40,765 ||47–40
|- bgcolor="bbffbb"
| 88 || July 12 || @ Mariners || 10–3 || Heaney (3–0) || Walker (7–7) || — || 36,955 || 48–40
|- bgcolor=#bbcaff
|ASG || July 14 || AL @ NLCincinnati, OH || 6–3 AL || Price (AL, DET) (6–2) || Kershaw (NL, LAD) (5–3) || — || 43,656 || 
|- bgcolor="bbffbb"
| 89 || July 17 || Red Sox || 1–0 || Smith (4–2) || Uehara (2–4) || — || 43,234 || 49–40
|- bgcolor="bbffbb"
| 90 || July 18 || Red Sox || 3–0 || Richards (10–6) || Porcello (5–10) || — || 43,631 || 50–40
|- bgcolor="bbffbb"
| 91 || July 19 || Red Sox || 11–1 || Santiago (7–4) || Rodríguez (5–3) || — ||  || 51–40
|- bgcolor="bbffbb"
| 92 || July 20 || Red Sox || 7–3 || Heaney (4–0) || Wright (3–3) || Smith (1) || 38,042 || 52–40
|- bgcolor="bbffbb"
| 93 || July 21 || Twins || 7–0 ||  Shoemaker (5–7) || Gibson (8–7)  || — || 38,937  || 53–40
|- bgcolor="bbffbb"
| 94 || July 22 || Twins || 5–2 || Wilson (8–7) || Pelfrey (5–7) || Street (25) || 40,239 || 54–40
|- bgcolor="ffbbbb"
| 95 || July 23 || Twins || 2–3 || Santana (2–0) || Richards (10–7)  || Perkins (29) || 36,134  || 54–41
|- bgcolor="ffbbbb"
| 96 || July 24 || Rangers || 2–4 || Lewis (10–4) || Tropeano (1–1)  || Tolleson (16) || 42,046 || 54–42
|- bgcolor="ffbbbb"
| 97 || July 25 || Rangers || 6–7 || Patton (1–0) || Smith (4–3) || Tolleson (17) || 43,052 || 54–43
|- bgcolor="bbffbb"
| 98 || July 26 || Rangers || 13–7 || Heaney (5–0) || Martinez (5–6)  || — || 38,539 || 55–43
|- bgcolor="ffbbbb"
| 99 || July 28 || @ Astros || 5–10 || McHugh (12–5)  || Wilson (8–8)  || — || 24,031 || 55–44
|- bgcolor="ffbbbb"
| 100 || July 29 || @ Astros || 3–6 || McCullers (5–3) || Richards (10–8)  || — || 31,272  || 55-45
|- bgcolor="ffbbbb"
| 101 || July 30 || @ Astros || 0–3 || Gregerson (4–1) || Álvarez (2–2) || — || 27,598  || 55-46
|- bgcolor="ffbbbb"
| 102 || July 31 || @ Dodgers || 3–5 || Greinke (10–2)  || Santiago (7–5)  || — || 53,380  || 55–47
|-

|- bgcolor="ffbbbb"
| 103 || August 1 || @ Dodgers || 1–3 || Kershaw (9–6)  || Heaney (5–1)  || — || 52,979  || 55–48
|- bgcolor="ffbbbb"
| 104 || August 2 || @ Dodgers || 3–5 || Báez (4–2) || Rucinski (0–2)  || — || 52,116  || 55–49
|- bgcolor="bbffbb"
| 105 || August 3 || Indians || 5–4 || Richards (11–8)  || Kluber (6–12)  || — || 37,030 || 56–49
|- bgcolor="ffbbbb"
| 106 || August 4 || Indians || 0–2 || McAllister (3–3)  || Álvarez (2–3)  || — || 38,159  || 56–50
|- bgcolor="bbffbb"
| 107 || August 5 || Indians || 4–3 || Bedrosian (1–0)  || Allen (1–4)  || — || 33,099  || 57–50
|- bgcolor="bbffbb"
| 108 || August 7 || Orioles || 8–4 || Salas (2–1) || Gausman (2–3) || — || 42,578 || 58–50
|- bgcolor="ffbbbb"
| 109 || August 8 || Orioles || 0–5 || Jiménez (9–7) || Richards (11–9) || — || 43,041 || 58–51
|- bgcolor="bbffbb"
| 110 || August 9 || Orioles || 5–4 (11) || Gott (2–0) || Roe (2–2) || — || 37,154 || 59–51
|- bgcolor="ffbbbb"
| 111 || August 10 || @ White Sox ||2–8|| Sale (10–7) || Shoemaker (5–8)  || || || 59–52
|- bgcolor="ffbbbb"
| 112 || August 11 || @ White Sox || 0–3 || Rodon (5–4)  || Santiago (7–6)  || Robertson (23) || 17,137 || 59–53
|- bgcolor="ffbbbb"
| 113 || August 12 || @ White Sox || 2–3 || Albers (2–0)  || Ramos (2–1)  || — || 17,171 || 59–54
|- bgcolor="bbffbb"
| 114 || August 13 || @ Royals || 7–6 || Álvarez (3–3)  || Holland (3–1)  || Street (27) || 32,098 || 60–54
|- bgcolor="ffbbbb"
| 115 || August 14 || @ Royals || 1–4 || Duffy (6–5)  || Weaver (4–9)  || Holland (26) || 36,926 || 60–55
|- bgcolor="ffbbbb"
| 116 || August 15 || @ Royals || 4–9 || Cueto (9–7)  || Shoemaker (5–9)  || — || 39,251 || 60–56
|- bgcolor="ffbbbb"
| 117 || August 16 || @ Royals || 3–4 || Herrera (4–2)  || Gott (2–1) || — || 36,845 || 60–57
|- bgcolor="bbffbb"
| 118 || August 17 || White Sox || 2–1 || Salas (3–1)  || Rodon (5–5)  || Street (28) || 36,431 || 61–57
|- bgcolor="bbffbb"
| 119 || August 18 || White Sox || 5–3 || Richards (12–9)  || Danks (6–10)  || Street (29) || 37,114 || 62–57
|- bgcolor="bbffbb"
| 120 || August 19 || White Sox || 1–0 || Weaver (5–9)  || Samardzija (8–9)  || Smith (2) || 35,036 || 63–57
|- bgcolor="ffbbbb"
| 121 || August 20 || White Sox || 2–8 || Quintana (7–10)  || Tropeano (1–2)  || — || 37,142  || 63–58
|- bgcolor="ffbbbb"
| 122 || August 21 || Blue Jays || 2–9 || Price (12–4)  || Santiago (7–7)  || — || 41,110 || 63–59
|- bgcolor="ffbbbb"
| 123 || August 22 || Blue Jays || 3–15 || Estrada (11–7)  || Heaney (5–2)  || — || 42,578 || 63–60
|- bgcolor="ffbbbb"
| 124 || August 23 || Blue Jays || 5–12 || Dickey (8–10)  || Richards (12–10)  || — || 37,060 || 63–61
|- bgcolor="bbffbb"
| 125 || August 25 || @ Tigers || 8–7 || Weaver (6–9)  || Simón (11–8)  || Street (30) || 33,649 || 64–61
|- bgcolor="ffbbbb"
| 126 || August 26 || @ Tigers || 0–5 || Verlander (2–6)  || Santiago (7–8)  || — || 31,938 || 64–62
|- bgcolor="bbffbb"
| 127 || August 27 || @ Tigers || 2–0 || Shoemaker (6–9)  || Wolf (0–2)  || Street (31) || 36,198 || 65–62
|- bgcolor="ffbbbb"
| 128 || August 28 || @ Indians || 1–3 || Bauer (10–10)  || Gott (2–2)  || Allen (27) || 22,273 || 65–63
|- bgcolor="ffbbbb"
| 129 || August 29 || @ Indians || 3–8 || Shaw (3–2)  || Smith (4–4)  || — || 22,843 || 65–64
|- bgcolor="ffbbbb"
| 130 || August 30 || @ Indians || 2–9 || Tomlin (3–1)  || Weaver (6–10)  || — || 22,328 || 65–65
|- bgcolor="ffbbbb"
| 131 || August 31 || @ Athletics || 5–11 || Doubront (2–1)  || Santiago (7–9)  || — || 12,054 || 65–66
|-

|- bgcolor="bbffbb"
| 132 || September 1 || @ Athletics || 6–2 || Shoemaker (7–9)  || Martin (2–4)  || — || 14,178 || 66–66
|- bgcolor="bbffbb"
| 133 || September 2 || @ Athletics || 9–4 || Heaney (6–2)  || Gray (12–7)  || — || 13,392 || 67–66
|- bgcolor="bbffbb"
| 134 || September 4 || Rangers || 5–2 || Richards (13–10)  || Pérez (2–4)  || Street (32) || 37,073 || 68–66
|- bgcolor="ffbbbb"
| 135 || September 5 || Rangers || 1–2 || Holland (3–1)  || Smith (4–5)  || Tolleson (29) || 39,889 || 68–67
|- bgcolor="bbffbb"
| 136 || September 6 || Rangers || 7–0 || Santiago (8–9)  || Lewis (14–8)  || — || 38,367 || 69–67
|- bgcolor="ffbbbb"
| 137 || September 7 || Dodgers || 5–7 || Greinke (16–3)  || Salas (3–2)  || Jansen (30) || 44,488 || 69–68
|- bgcolor="ffbbbb"
| 138 || September 8 || Dodgers || 4–6 || Kershaw (13–6)  || Heaney (6–3)  || Jansen (31) || 41,086 || 69–69
|- bgcolor="bbffbb"
| 139 || September 9 || Dodgers || 3–2 || Álvarez (4–3)  || Avilán (2–5) || Street (33) || 42,799 || 70–69
|- bgcolor="bbffbb"
| 140 || September 11 || Astros || 3–2 || Weaver (7–10) || Keuchel (17–7)  || Street (34) || 39,636 || 71–69
|- bgcolor="bbffbb"
| 141 || September 12 || Astros || 3–2 || Smith (5–5)  || Harris (5–3)  || Street (35) || 41,130 || 72–69
|- bgcolor="ffbbbb"
| 142 || September 13 || Astros || 3–5 || Qualls (2–4)  || Street (3–3)  || Gregerson (27) || 41,550 || 72–70
|- bgcolor="ffbbbb"
| 143 || September 14 || @ Mariners || 1–10 || Walker (11–8) || Richards (13–11)  || — || 13,681 || 72–71
|- bgcolor="bbffbb"
| 144 || September 15 || @ Mariners || 4–3 || Tropeano (2–2)  || Hernández (17–9)  || Smith (3) || 15,365 || 73–71
|- bgcolor="ffbbbb"
| 145 || September 16 || @ Mariners || 1–3 || Iwakuma (8–4)  || Weaver (7–11)  || Wilhelmsen (11) || 16,176 || 73–72
|- bgcolor="bbffbb"
| 146 || September 17 || @ Twins || 11–8 || Morin (2–1)  || Achter (0–1)  || Street (36) || 18,697 || 74–72
|- bgcolor="bbbbbb"
|– || September 18 || @ Twins || colspan=6 | Postponed (rain) Made up as a doubleheader on September 19
|- bgcolor="bbffbb"
| 147 || September 19 || @ Twins || 4–3 (12) || Morin (3–1) || Boyer (3–5) || Street (37) || 22,878 || 75–72
|- bgcolor="bbffbb"
| 148 || September 19 || @ Twins || 5–2 || Richards (14–11) || Pelfrey (6–10) || Street (38) || 33,300 || 76–72
|- bgcolor="ffbbbb"
| 149 || September 20 || @ Twins || 1–8 || Duffey (4–1) || Shoemaker (7–10) || — || 25,302 || 76–73
|- bgcolor="ffbbbb"
| 150 || September 21 || @ Astros || 3–6 || Keuchel (18–8) || Weaver (7–12) || Gregerson (28) || 25,318 || 76–74
|- bgcolor="bbffbb"
| 151 || September 22 || @ Astros || 4–3 || Santiago (9–9) || McCullers (5–7) || Street (39) || 25,671 || 77–74
|- bgcolor="bbffbb"
| 152 || September 23 || @ Astros || 6–5 || Gott (3–2) || Harris (5–5) || Street (40) || 25,573 || 78–74
|- bgcolor="bbffbb"
| 153 || September 25 || Mariners || 8–4 || Richards (15–11) || Nuño (1–4) || — || 38,355 || 79–74
|- bgcolor="bbffbb"
| 154 || September 26 || Mariners || 3–2 || Salas (4–2) || Farquhar (1–5) || — || 37,866 || 80–74
|- bgcolor="bbffbb"
| 155 || September 27 || Mariners || 3–2 || Salas (5–2) || Iwakuma (9–5) || Morin (1) || 35,243 || 81–74
|- bgcolor="bbffbb"
| 156 || September 28 || Athletics || 5–4 || Gott (4–2) || Mujica (4–5) || — || 31,858 || 82–74
|- bgcolor="bbffbb"
| 157 || September 29 || Athletics || 8–1 || Tropeano (3–2) || Bassitt (1–8) || — || 33,470 || 83–74
|- bgcolor="ffbbbb"
| 158 || September 30 || Athletics || 7–8 || Dull (1–1)  || Morin (3–2)  || Doolittle (3) || 34,033 || 83–75
|-

|- bgcolor="ffbbbb"
| 159 || October 1 || @ Rangers || 3–5 || Holland (4–3) || Heaney (6–4) || Tolleson (35) || 32,338 || 83–76
|- bgcolor="bbffbb"
| 160 || October 2 || @ Rangers || 2–1 || Morin (4–2) || Tolleson (6–4) || Smith (4) || 47,219 || 84–76
|- bgcolor="bbffbb"
| 161 || October 3 || @ Rangers || 11–10 || Reyes (1–0) || Ohlendorf (3–1) || Smith (5) || 37,271 || 85–76
|- bgcolor="ffbbbb"
| 162 || October 4 || @ Rangers || 2–9 || Hamels (13-8) || Richards  || — || 45,772 || 85–77
|-

|-
| Legend:       = Win       = Loss       = Postponement  = All-Star Game Bold = Angels team member

Roster

Statistics
Through October 4, 2015

Batting
Note: G = Games played; AB = At bats; R = Runs scored; H = Hits; 2B = Doubles; 3B = Triples; HR = Home runs; RBI = Runs batted in; BB = Base on balls; SO = Strikeouts; AVG = Batting average; SB = Stolen bases

Pitching
Note: W = Wins; L = Losses; ERA = Earned run average; G = Games pitched; GS = Games started; SV = Saves; IP = Innings pitched; H = Hits allowed; R = Runs allowed; ER = Earned runs allowed; HR = Home runs allowed; BB = Walks allowed; K = Strikeouts

Farm system

See also

Los Angeles Angels
Angel Stadium

References

External links
2015 Los Angeles Angels Official Site
2015 Los Angeles Angels season at Baseball Reference

Los Angeles Angels seasons
Los Angeles Angels
2015 in California
Los Angeles Angels